Stafford Mills is an historic textile mill complex located on County Street in Fall River, Massachusetts, USA.  Founded in 1872, it is a well-preserved late-19th century textile complex, typical of the mills built in Fall River during its period of most rapid growth.  It is noted in particular for its exceptionally fine Romanesque brick office building.  The complex was added to the National Register of Historic Places in 1983.

Description and history
It consists of a series of interconnected buildings, most built at different times. The two principal mill buildings are both five stories tall, built of Fall River granite; Mill Number 2 is slightly larger, but Mill Number 1 has a large two-story weave shed attached to its northern end. The buildings are somewhat unusual in not having towers, a common mill feature. Set in the mill yard between these two structures are attached picker and boiler houses, also built of granite. The office building stands at the center of the southern end of the millyard, facing County Street; it is a two-story Romanesque brick building.

History
The Stafford Mills company was incorporated in 1870 with Foster H. Stafford as its first president.  The two mills were built in 1872 and 1888, and the office building was added in 1892.  The company produced print cloths, and operated until 1929 when it was closed.

Today, the complex is occupied by a variety of small businesses and a discount furniture store. The intersection of County Street, Pleasant Street and Quarry Street in front of the mill is known as Stafford Square.

Stafford Mills had a major fire on January 13, 2020 displacing many of the tenant companies and damaging the structure.

See also
National Register of Historic Places listings in Fall River, Massachusetts
List of mills in Fall River, Massachusetts

References

Industrial buildings completed in 1872
Industrial buildings and structures on the National Register of Historic Places in Massachusetts
Textile mills in Fall River, Massachusetts
National Register of Historic Places in Fall River, Massachusetts
1872 establishments in Massachusetts